Eriz Cerezo Ferrón (born 31 July 1997 in Bilbao) is a Spanish television communicator and journalist.

Life and career 

Eriz Cerezo was born Bilbao on 31 July 1997. He graduated in audiovisual communication at the University of the Basque Country (UPV/EHU) (2015–2019). Subsequently, he completed a master's degree (MA) in television journalism at Nebrija University (2019-2020).

As a communicator and journalist, he worked as a reporter on the "La Kapital" program on TeleBilbao. He traveled to Madrid and from 2020 to 2022 he became a reporter for Antena 3 Noticias in its weekend edition on Antena 3. In the same tv channel, he was part of the Antena Abierta team and in 2022, together with Roberto Brasero, he was part of the Mundo Brasero team. That same summer he began working on the program Madrid Directo on Telemadrid and months later he became a reporter for the program presented by Nuria Roca on Sunday afternoons on La Sexta, called "La Roca".

In 2018 he created his own theatre company and created the play "Dalias", a show based on texts by Federico García Lorca.

In the year 2021, he published his first book of poems, Tan sólo setenta y nueve días (Postdata Editions).

Filmography

Television 

 2014, Mucha Mierda!, dir. Eriz Cerezo (screenplay Eriz Cerezo)
 2017, My life vlog, dir. Eriz Cerezo, Tele 7

Film 

 2015, Psiconautas, dir. Pedro Rivero y Alberto Vázquez (Goya Award)
 2016, La tercera ley de Newton, dir. Jorge Barrios

Stage 

 2014, Miau, miau, dir. Sandra Tejero
 2017, Hamlet, dir. David Valdelvira (FETABI Award)
 2018, Yerma, dir. Sandra Tejero
 2018, The inspector, dir. Marina Shimanskaya y David Valdelvira
 2018, Delayed, dir. Eriz Cerezo

Works 

 2021, Tan sólo setenta y nueve días, Postdata Editions.

References 

1997 births
Living people
People from Bilbao
21st-century Spanish actors
Spanish television actors
University of the Basque Country alumni